Gero von Boehm (born 20 April 1954 in Hanover; full name Kurt-Gero von Boehm-Bezing) is a German director, journalist and television presenter.

Life 
Gero von Boehm grew up in Heidelberg and studied law and social studies at the Heidelberg University and in New York City. When he was 20 years old he started writing articles for the weekly paper Die Zeit and others. Later he had been working for the radio station of the Westdeutscher Rundfunk, the Südwestfunk and the Deutschlandfunk. He filmed his first documentary for television in 1975. In 1978 he founded the film production company interscience film along with his wife Christiane, who is in charge of finances, production and administration.

In addition to his television projects Gero von Boehm kept interviewing great personalities for his series Wortwechsel for Südwestfunk. From 2002 to 2010 he presented the show Gero von Boehm meets... on German broadcaster 3sat. In 2011 he founded the film production company LUPA Film.

Gero von Boehm has three children and lives in Berlin and France.

Filmography 
More than 100 documentaries for ARD, ZDF, ARTE, France 3, RAI, Sundance Channel (selection):

 1982: Henry Moore – Begegnung zwischen Licht und Stein
 1982: Schöpfer Mensch – Auf den Spuren der Kreativität
 1983: Armut in Amerika
 1985: Tatort: Der Mord danach
 1986: Portrait Arthur Miller
 1986: Die Friedenskinder von Belfast
 1987: Chimären
 1987: Die Bernstorff-Chronik
 1987: Das Haus am Ende des Tunnels
 1988: Die Streetkids von New York
 1988: Henri Matisse – Die Jahre in Nizza
 1989: Quarantäne
 1989: Portrait Golo Mann
 1990: Der letzte Traum
 1990: 2-part WDR-series: Philosophie heute: Boulevard der Denker
 1990: Portrait Marcel Reich-Ranicki
 1992: Der achte Tag der Schöpfung
 1992: Die Gendoktoren
 1992: 4-part ZDF-series: Im Gegenlicht – eine italienische Reise (with Joachim Fest)
 1992: 2-part WDR-series: Philosophie heute: Avenue der Denker
 1993: Schöpfer Mensch – Forscherstars greifen nach den Sternen
 1993: Tanz mit dem Vulkan – Portrait Susan Sontag
 1993: Blut-Verwandtschaften – Mafia, Morde und Milliarden
 1993: Zeugen des Jahrhunderts: Jeanne Hersch
 1994: 2-part ZDF-series: Menschen, Triebe, Sensationen
 1994: Der Tod in Hollywood
 1994: Faust III – Auf dem Weg zum künstlichen Leben
 1994/1995: Portrait Umberto Eco
 1994/1995: Ein abenteuerliches Herz – Portrait zum 100. Geburtstag Ernst Jüngers
 1995: Der Junge mit der roten Mütze – Pierre Matisse – ein Leben in Bildern
 1995: Documentary Trilogy for ZDF: Der Killer-Faktor
 1996: David Hockney – Augenlust
 1996: Balthus – Geheimnisse eines Malers
 1997: Kurt Masur – The Portrait
 1997: Zeugen des Jahrhunderts: Gregor von Rezzori
 1997: 5-part ZDF-series Odyssee 3000 – Gero von Boehm berichtet
 1998: 5-part sequel of the ZDF-series Odyssee 3000 – Gero von Boehm berichtet
 1998: Mandarin der Moderne – Der Architekt I.M. Pei
 1999: „Glücklich bin ich nie...“ – Augenblicke im Leben des Karl Lagerfeld
 1999: Geheimakte G. – Goethe's wahre italienische Reise
 1999: Sphinx: Casanova – Magier der Leidenschaften
 1999: Bruder der Unberührbaren – Pierre Ceyrac, ein Leben in Indien
 2000: Mord am Canal Grande: Donna Leon und Venedig
 2000: Hamlet in Hollywood – Die Welten des Maximilian Schell
 2000: „Ich sag’ nicht ja, ich sag’ nicht nein“: Zarah Leander
 2001: Die Menschheitsformel – Auf der Suche nach dem letzten Geheimnis
 2001: ZDF-series: Die großen Clans – Glanz und Drama berühmter Familien
 Kennedy & Agnelli
 Rothschild & Spencer
 Porsche, Bismarck & Benetton
 2001: Das letzte Geheimnis von Pompei
 2001: Der Mann, der durchs Feuer ging: Alberto Giacometti, ein Leben
 2001: Isabella Rossellini – My Life
 2001: Menschenfresser, Menschenfreund – Gero von Boehm meets Georg Stefan Troller
 2002: Albert Speer – My Life
 2002: J-C de Castelbajac – My Life
 2002: Stadt aus Glas – Paul Auster in New York
 2002: Helmut Newton – My Life
 2003: Diva der Macht – Wer war Jacqueline Kennedy Onassis?
 2003: Harry Belafonte – My Life
 2004: Audrey Hepburn – Ein Star auf der Suche
 2004: ZDF/ARTE-series: Palaces of Power:
 The Vatican
 The Kremlin
 The White House
 The Elysée Palace
 The Buckingham Palace
 2004: Armin Mueller-Stahl – My Life
 2004: Magier des Lichts – Der Architekt Richard Meier
 2005: Blanca Li – My Life
 2005: Bettina Rheims – My Life
 2005: Georg Stefan Troller – My Life
 2002 to 2010: Gero von Boehm meets…
 2006: Karol Wojtyła – Geheimnisse eines Papstes (leading parts: Michael Mendl and Mario Adorf)
 2007: Giants: Ludwig van Beethoven (leading part: Uwe Ochsenknecht)
 2007: Giants: Alexander von Humboldt (leading parts: Matthias Habich and Nikolai Kinski)
 2007: Giants: Albert Einstein (leading part: Maximilian Schell)
 2007: ZDF-series: Paläste der Macht – Herrscher des Orients
 2007: André Glucksmann – My Life
 2008: with Peter Scholl-Latour. ZDF-series: Between the Frontlines
 2008: ZDF-series: A Night in November
 2008: Die Tryptichen des Zao Wou-Ki
 2008: Alexandra Maria Lara – My Life
 2009: 2-part ZDF-series: Kreml, Kaviar und Milliarden
 2009: Paris – Berlin, the Debate
 2009: Michael Haneke – My Life
 2010: Isabella Rossellini – Aus dem Leben eines Schmetterlings
 2010: Erika Pluhar – My Life
 2011: Bitte stören – Martin Walser and Thea Dorn
 2011: Bitte stören – Hans Magnus Enzensberger and Thea Dorn
 2011: Close Up – Veruschka, Vera Gräfin Lehndorff
 2011: 6-part ZDF-series: Terra X: A Short History of the World - with Hape Kerkeling
 2011 to 2012: 5-part series: Castles and Palaces of Europe (with Jeremy JP Fekete)
 Loire Valley in France Gero von Boehm
 Baden-Württemberg in Germany Jeremy J.P. Fekete
 Southern England and The Midlands Gero von Boehm
 Piedmont in Italy Jeremy J.P. Fekete
 Estremadura in Portugal Jeremy J.P. Fekete
 since 2012: Precht
 2012: Das Adlon - Die Dokumentation
 2013: Der Clan - Die Dokumentation
 2014: Auf Leben und Tod - Peter Scholl-Latour wird 90.
 since 2014: Zeugen des Jahrhunderts
 2014: Germany's Creative Spirits - Karl Lagerfeld
 2014/2015: 6-part ZDF-series: Terra X: The German Saga - With Christopher Clark
 2014: Hape Kerkeling - Keine Geburtstagsshow!
 2015: 7-part talk show: Close Up - Gero von Boehm asks
 2015: Auf den Spuren der Einheit – With Christopher Clark
 2015: Germany's Creative Spirits - Peter Lindbergh
 2016: 2-part ZDF-series: Terra X: Australia Saga - With Christopher Clark
 2017: Henry Miller – Prophet of Desire
 2017: ′′Germany′s Creative spirits - Claus Peymann′′
 2017: 6-Part-Documentary ZDF: Terra X: The Europe Saga with Christopher Clark
 2018: 2-Part-Documentary ZDF: TerraX: Exodus? A History of the Jews in Europe
 2020: Planet of Treasures - A History of Mankind. Along the Line of UNESCO World Heritage
 2020: Helmut Newton – The Bad and the Beautiful

Books 
 Odyssee 3000 – Reisen in die Zukunft, Munich: C. Bertelsmann, 1998, .
 Das Haus des Malers. Balthus im Grand Chalet, Fotografien von Kishin Shinoyama. Mit einem Vorwort von Gero von Boehm. Munich: Schirmer/Mosel, 2000, .
 Conversations with I.M. Pei. Light is the Key, Munich: Prestel, 2000, .
 Mythos Kennedy, Munich: Collection Rolf Heyne, 2003, .
 Wer war Albert Einstein? E=mc², Munich: Collection Rolf Heyne, 2005, .
 Unterwegs in der Weltgeschichte – mit Hape Kerkeling. Hörbuch. Munich: Random House, 2011, .
 Begegnungen. Menschenbilder aus drei Jahrzehnten, Munich: Collection Rolf Heyne, 2012, .
 Nahaufnahmen. Fünfzig Gespräche mit dem Leben, Berlin: Propyläen Verlag, 2016, .

Awards 
 1980 Wilhelmine-Lübke-Preis
 1991 Television Award by Hartmannbund
 1993 Bavarian TV Award
 1993 Award by the Eduard Rhein Foundation (with Ernst Waldemar Bauer)
 2016 Bert-Donnepp-Award
 2017 Steiger Award
 2019 Bavarian TV Award in the category culture and education as producer and director for Exodus? A history of the Jews in Europe
 Chevalier des Arts et Lettres of the French Republic

Gero von Boehm is a member of the International Academy of Television Arts & Sciences in New York.

References

External links 

 
 
 production company by Gero von Boehm
 portrait of Gero von Boehm

German male journalists
1954 births
Mass media people from Heidelberg
Living people
German male writers
21st-century German journalists
20th-century German journalists
Südwestrundfunk people
Westdeutscher Rundfunk people